Tista, also called Tistedalselva or Tistakanalen, is a river in Halden municipality, in Østfold county, Norway. It is the main river in the Haldenvassdraget system and flows from Femsjøen lake to Iddefjorden fjord. The river is less than 5 km long, calculated from the dam in Femsjøen to the mouth of the fjord.

References

 

Halden
Rivers of Viken
Rivers of Norway